The Vojvodina Coalition (Serbian: Коалиција Војводина / Koalicija Vojvodina) was a political coalition in the Serbian province of Vojvodina from 1996 to 2005. In 2005, it united with several other parties into newly formed Vojvodina's Party.

History
Vojvodina Coalition was founded in 1996 and was composed from 3 main political parties - the League of Social Democrats of Vojvodina, the People's Peasant Party, and the Reformist Democratic Party of Vojvodina, as well as from several other smaller political parties and organizations, including Alliance of Subotica Citizens led by Boško Kovačević and Slavko Parać, Vojvodinian Club, Banatian Forum, and other organizations and movements that advocated peace and civic rights.

Among other goals, Coalition advocated the establishment of full legislative, judicial and executive autonomy of Vojvodina within Serbia as well as equal position of Vojvodina within the Federal Republic of Yugoslavia.

In 2003, the People's Peasant Party and its new leader Marijan Rističević were expelled from the coalition.

Members

Electoral performance 
Coalition participated outside bigger alliance only on 1997 Serbian general election, receiving less than 3% and finishing 4th.

Parliamentary election

Presidential election

Political leaders
Leaders of the Vojvodina Coalition were Dragan Veselinov, Mile Isakov, and Nenad Čanak.

References

Defunct political party alliances in Serbia
Politics of Vojvodina